Civizelotes is a genus of ground spiders that was first described by A. Senglet in 2012.

Species
 it contains twelve species:
Civizelotes aituar Esyunin & Tuneva, 2020 – Russia (Europe)
Civizelotes akmon Chatzaki, 2021 – Greece
Civizelotes caucasius (L. Koch, 1866) – Europe, Turkey, Caucasus, Kazakhstan, Iran, Central Asia, China
Civizelotes civicus (Simon, 1878) (type) – Europe, Madeira, Morocco
Civizelotes dentatidens (Simon, 1914) – Spain, France, Italy (mainland, Sardinia)
Civizelotes gracilis (Canestrini, 1868) – Central and South-Eastern Europe, Caucasus (Russia, Georgia), Turkey
Civizelotes ibericus Senglet, 2012 – Spain, France
Civizelotes medianoides Senglet, 2012 – Spain
Civizelotes medianus (Denis, 1936) – Spain, Andorra, France
Civizelotes pygmaeus (Miller, 1943) – Europe to Kazakhstan
Civizelotes solstitialis (Levy, 1998) – Italy (Sardinia), Bulgaria, Greece, Turkey, Cyprus, Israel, Iran, Kazakhstan, Kyrgyzstan, Tajikistan, Pakistan
Civizelotes tibichaetoforus Tuneva & Kuzmin, 2016 – Russia (Europe)

References

Araneomorphae genera
Gnaphosidae
Spiders of Asia